The 2018–19 Scottish Premiership (known as the Ladbrokes Premiership for sponsorship reasons) was the sixth season of the Scottish Premiership, the highest division of Scottish football. The fixtures were published on 15 June 2018 and the season began on 4 August 2018.

Twelve teams contested the league: Aberdeen, Celtic, Dundee, Hamilton Academical, Heart of Midlothian, Hibernian, Kilmarnock, Livingston, Motherwell, Rangers, St Johnstone and St Mirren.

On 4 May 2019, Celtic won their eighth consecutive title and 50th overall after a 3–0 win over Aberdeen.

Teams

To Premiership

St Mirren secured the Championship title and promotion to the Premiership on 14 April 2018 after a goalless draw with Livingston, who were also promoted after winning the play-off final.

To Championship

Ross County were relegated to the Championship on 12 May 2018 after a 1–1 draw with St Johnstone. Partick Thistle were also relegated following a 3–1 aggregate defeat to Livingston in the play-off final.

Stadia and locations

Personnel and kits

Managerial changes

Format
In the initial phase of the season, the 12 teams will play a round-robin tournament whereby each team plays each one of the other teams three times. After 33 games, the league splits into two sections of six teams, with each team playing every other team in their section once. The league attempts to balance the fixture list so that teams in the same section have played each other twice at home and twice away, but sometimes this is impossible. A total of 228 matches will be played, with 38 matches played by each team.

League summary

League table

Positions by round
The table lists the positions of teams after each week of matches. In order to preserve chronological progress, any postponed matches are not included in the round at which they were originally scheduled but added to the full round they were played immediately afterwards. For example, if a match is scheduled for matchday 13, but then postponed and played between days 16 and 17, it will be added to the standings for day 16.
 

 

Updated: 19 May 2019

Results

Matches 1–22
Teams play each other twice, once at home and once away.

Matches 23–33
Teams play each other once.

Matches 34–38
After 33 matches, the league splits into two sections of six teams i.e. the top six and the bottom six, with the teams playing every other team in their section once (either at home or away). The exact matches are determined by the position of the teams in the league table at the time of the split.

Top six

Bottom six

Season statistics

Scoring

Top scorers

Hat-tricks

Note

4  Player scored four goals; (H) = Home, (A) = Away

Attendances
These are the average attendances of the teams.

Awards

Premiership play-offs
The quarter-final was contested by Ayr United and Inverness Caledonian Thistle, with Inverness Caledonian Thistle advancing to the semi-final where they lost to Dundee United. Dundee United faced St Mirren in the final, with the Saints securing the last place in the 2019–20 Premiership after victory in a penalty shoot-out.

Quarter-final

First leg

Second leg

Semi-final

First leg

Second leg

Final

First leg

Second leg

Broadcasting

Live Matches 
The SPFL allows Sky Sports and BT Sport to broadcast up to six live home matches (combined) for each club, although this is only four for Celtic and Rangers. The TV deal allows the broadcasters to show 30 games each (and the play-offs for BT Sport) and provides approximately £21m to the SPFL per season.

Highlights 
Sky Sports hold the rights to Saturday night highlights and show the Premiership goals on Sky Sports News in their Goals Express programme. Gaelic-language channel BBC Alba can broadcast in full the repeat of 38 Saturday 3pm matches "as live" at 5.30pm. The main Premiership highlights programme is BBC Scotland's Sportscene programme, which shows in-depth highlights of all six Premiership matches every weekend. STV show the goals on Monday nights during the Sport section of their News at Six programme. The SPFL also uploads the goals from every Premiership match onto its YouTube channel — available from 6pm on a Sunday for UK and Ireland viewers and 10pm on a Saturday for those worldwide.

See also
Nine in a row

References

External links
Official website 

Scottish Premiership seasons
1
1
Scot